Taylor Phillip Dent (born April 24, 1981) is a retired professional tennis player from the United States. He reached a career-high singles ranking of World No. 21, winning 4 singles titles.

Career

Early career and back injury
Dent won ATP titles in Newport (2002), Bangkok (2003), Memphis (2003), and Moscow (2003), and reached the finals of three other events on tour. His victory in Memphis is still often referred to as his most impressive victory, as he  beat future world No. 1 Andy Roddick in the final.

Dent played with distinction at the 2004 Summer Olympics, where he made a push all the way to the semi-finals, where he was defeated by eventual gold medalist Nicolás Massú of Chile. He went on to lose the Bronze medal match 16–14 in the third set against Fernando González of Chile.

Dent, paired with Lisa Raymond, won the 2006 Hopman Cup, defeating the Netherlands two sets to one in the final.

In 2006 Dent did not play many competitive matches, due to a recurring back and groin problem. Dent had back surgery on March 19, 2007.

Return from injury
On May 26, 2008, Dent received a wild card and played at the Carson challenger in the United States. It was his first match since February 2006. He lost his first round match to Cecil Mamiit. In July 2008 Dent took a wild card into his first ATP tour event for two seasons at the Hall of Fame tennis tournament in Newport, Rhode Island. He lost in three sets to Canada's Frank Dancevic.

On November 12, 2008, Dent won his first comeback match at the Champaign challenger against Frédéric Niemeyer, 6–3, 7–6(3). He followed this win up by defeating second seed and fellow American Robert Kendrick. In the third round, Dent had to withdraw against Sam Warburg. Using his protected ranking of 56, Dent played the 2009 Australian Open, where he was eliminated in the first round by Amer Delić.

As a qualifier, he reached the fourth round of the 2009 Miami Open, defeating Nicolás Almagro and Tommy Robredo in the process. He lost to Roger Federer in the fourth round, 3–6, 2–6. Despite the scoreline, the first set was a very entertaining encounter, with Federer's longest service game lasting just short of a quarter of an hour; Dent had eight break point opportunities. He had a poor run of form following this, but reversed the poor form by qualifying for Wimbledon, having entered the qualifying via a wildcard. He won his way through to the main draw, where he lost to Daniel Gimeno Traver in five sets in the first round.

He received a wild card for the 2009 US Open and won his first US Open match since 2005, upsetting Feliciano López in four sets. He advanced to the third round after beating Iván Navarro in the second round, in a five-set match. Following the match, he took the umpire microphone and thanked the crowd for support, following it with a victory lap around the stadium. In the third round, he was beaten by Andy Murray in straight sets. Following the US Open, Dent won the USTA Challenger of Oklahoma in Tulsa.

In his opening event of the 2010 season, he entered the main draw at the 2010 Australian Open. He defeated Fabio Fognini, in the first round and moved on to face tenth seed Jo-Wilfried Tsonga, to whom he lost.

On May 25, 2010, in Roland Garros, against Nicolás Lapentti, Dent served at 240 km/h and set a new tournament record that Fernando Verdasco and Andy Roddick had held before him (with 232 km/h). Additionally, at the 2010 Wimbledon Championships on June 23, 2010, Dent set a record with the fastest serve ever recorded at the Wimbledon tournament at 148 mph.

On November 8, 2010, Taylor Dent announced his retirement from professional tennis.

Playing style
Unusual for a contemporary tennis player, Dent favored a pure serve-and-volley style of play. He possessed a powerful serve and strong volleys. He had the fourth fastest serve in the world, at a velocity of 243 km/h. At the 2010 Wimbledon Championships he set the record for the fastest serve ever recorded at the event with a speed of 238 km/h. (148 mph)

Personal life
Dent is the son of former ATP player and 1974 Australian Open finalist Phil Dent. Taylor's mother, Betty Ann Grubb Stuart, who has remarried, reached the US Open doubles final in 1977 with Renée Richards. Grubb was a former top-10 singles player in the United States. Dent's half-brother, Brett Hansen-Dent, played on the ATP circuit for a short time after playing on the tennis team of the University of Southern California and reaching the singles final of the NCAA Men's Tennis Championship.

His godfather is the former top ten player John Alexander, of Australia, who was Phil Dent's doubles partner when that duo won the 1975 Australian Open doubles title.

Dent's first cousin, Misty May-Treanor, was one of the top pro volleyball players in the world, and she and her teammates won the gold medals at the 2004 Summer Olympics, 2008 Summer Olympics and the 2012 Summer Olympics.

Dent appeared in an American TV commercial for the insurance company Genworth Financial as the opponent of a boy playing the role of Jaden Agassi, the young son of Andre Agassi and Steffi Graf.

Dent attended Corona del Mar High School in Newport Beach, California, and he was on the interscholastic tennis team there. Dent also attended the Monte Vista High School, in Northern California.

On December 8, 2006, Dent married WTA Tour player, Jennifer Hopkins. Their wedding party  included Maria Sharapova, Nick Bollettieri, Jan-Michael Gambill, Tommy Haas, Xavier Malisse, Willie Alumbaugh  and Mashona Washington. Jenny gave birth to a son in 2010 and a daughter in 2014.

Taylor has been a commentator on The Tennis Channel for the US Open in 2006, 2007, and 2011.

Dent currently resides in Keller, Texas, with wife Jennifer Hopkins and their four children. The two along with Taylor's father, Phil Dent, are opening The Birch Racquet and Lawn Club, located in Keller, Texas, which is presently being built.

Major finals

Olympic finals

Singles: 1 (0–1)

ATP career finals

Singles: 7 (4 titles, 3 runner-ups)

Doubles: 1 (1 runner-up)

ATP Challenger and ITF Futures finals

Singles: 7 (5–2)

Doubles: 1 (1–0)

Performance timeline

Singles

See also
 List of male tennis players

References

External links

 
 
 

1981 births
Living people
American male tennis players
American people of Australian descent
Hopman Cup competitors
Olympic tennis players of the United States
Sportspeople from Bradenton, Florida
Sportspeople from Newport Beach, California
Tennis players at the 2004 Summer Olympics
Tennis people from California
Tennis people from Florida